The Vernon Square–Columbus Square Historic District is a historic area on the eastern side of Darien, Georgia.  It encompasses two squares of the original 1805 city plan, although Vernon Square now contains a circular street.  The plan was derived from James Oglethorpe's plan for Savannah.  The area of Vernon and Columbus Wards was platted in 1805.  The historic buildings in the area date back to the mid-19th and early 20th centuries.  The houses are mostly modest wood-framed structures with weatherboard siding and wood detail.

History
The area thrived as a center of the timber industry in the late 19th century. The area contains houses representing Darien's middle-class white and black families.  Darien had an unusually large group of middle-class black families in the late 19th century.  McIntosh County frequently had a black representative to the state legislature from 1868 to 1907.

Contributing buildings

See also
 St. Andrew's Episcopal Church - a contributing building
 West Darien Historic District

References

External links
 

Georgian architecture in Georgia (U.S. state)
Victorian architecture in Georgia (U.S. state)
Buildings and structures completed in 1805
Geography of McIntosh County, Georgia
Historic districts on the National Register of Historic Places in Georgia (U.S. state)
National Register of Historic Places in McIntosh County, Georgia